David Pogosian (born August 21, 1974 in Gori, Georgian SSR) is a Georgian wrestler of Armenian descent. He won a bronze medal in the 2001 World Wrestling Championships at 58 kg.

External links
 

1974 births
Living people
People from Gori, Georgia
Wrestlers at the 2000 Summer Olympics
Male sport wrestlers from Georgia (country)
Wrestlers at the 2004 Summer Olympics
Olympic wrestlers of Georgia (country)
World Wrestling Championships medalists
European Wrestling Championships medalists
21st-century people from Georgia (country)